Lone Star Area Council may be:
Lone Star Area Council (#569) now the Circle Ten Council
Lone Star Area Council (#580) now the NeTseO Trails Council